The Staffordshire Women's cricket team is the women's representative cricket team for the English historic county of Staffordshire. They play their home games at various grounds across the county, including Tunstall Road, Knypersley and are captained by Stephanie Butler. In 2019, they played in Division Three of the final season of the Women's County Championship, and have since competed in the Women's Twenty20 Cup. They are partnered with the West Midlands regional side Central Sparks.

History
Staffordshire Women joined the Women's County Championship in 2000, replacing West Midlands Women, and won Division 2 in their first season, going unbeaten and gaining promotion. Staffordshire were relegated two seasons later, and reached as low as Division Four in 2008. They also joined the Women's Twenty20 Cup in 2009, winning two promotions when the tournament was regionalised, and since playing in Division Two and Three. In 2021, they competed in the West Midlands Group of the Twenty20 Cup, finishing 5th. They finished second in their group of the 2022 Women's Twenty20 Cup, before losing in the group final to Worcestershire. Staffordshire batter Davina Perrin was the fourth-highest run-scorer in the competition, with 242 runs. They also competed in the West Midlands Regional Cup in 2022, finishing fourth out of four teams.

Meanwhile, in the Championship, Staffordshire began their progression back up through the Divisions, winning promotion from Division Three in 2011, and from Division Two in 2015, with batter Evelyn Jones ending the 2015 season as leading run-scorer in the division. Their stay in Division 1 was short-lived, however, as they were relegated in 2016, and suffered a second consecutive relegation the following season. In the final two years of the Championship, Staffordshire played in Division 3, but did win their group in 2019.

England batter Danni Wyatt made her international debut whilst playing for Staffordshire, and the county is also the original team of England bowler Georgia Elwiss.

Players

Current squad
Based on appearances in the 2022 season.

Notable players
Players who have played for Staffordshire and played internationally are listed below, in order of first international appearance (given in brackets):

 Julie Crump (1989)
 Barbara Daniels (1993)
 Sue Redfern (1995)
 Anna Smith (1996)
 Lucy Pearson (1996)
 Laura Newton (1997)
 Clare Gough (2001)
 Lonell de Beer (2005)
 Rachel Priest (2007)
 Shanel Daley (2008)
 Elyse Villani (2009)
 Kate Ebrahim (2010)
 Danni Wyatt (2010)
 Georgia Elwiss (2011)
 Molly Strano (2017)

Seasons

Women's County Championship

Women's Twenty20 Cup

See also
 Staffordshire County Cricket Club
 Central Sparks

References

Cricket in Staffordshire
Women's cricket teams in England